Winebrenner may refer to:

John Winebrenner, founder of the Churches of God General Conference
Churches of God General Conference (Winebrenner)
Winebrenner Theological Seminary
Winebrenner Run, Pennsylvania
Winebrenners Crossroad, West Virginia